Mary Ann Buxton (c.1795 – 18 October 1888) was a New Zealand teacher and Businessperson. She was born in Stoke Newington, Middlesex, England.

She founded and managed the perhaps most successful and well known combined school for small children and girl's pension in Thorndon, New Zealand between 1841 and 1878. She was additionally a successful landowner and greatly expanded the lands she inherited from her late spouse in 1847.

References

1888 deaths
New Zealand women in business
English emigrants to New Zealand
Year of birth uncertain
19th-century New Zealand businesspeople
19th-century New Zealand businesswomen
19th-century  New Zealand educators
19th-century landowners